Ladyhawke may refer to:

 Ladyhawke (musician) (born 1979), New Zealand singer-songwriter
 Ladyhawke (album), her 2008 studio album
 Ladyhawke (film), a 1985 film starring Matthew Broderick, Rutger Hauer and Michelle Pfeiffer

See also
 Ladyhawk (disambiguation)